Marcos da Silva Bonfim or simply Marcão (born 7 January 1989) is a Brazilian football midfielder who plays for Lusitano VRSA.

Club career
He made his professional debut in the First Professional Football League for Akademik on 21 August 2010 in a game against Sliven.

References

External links
 Profile at PersianLeague
 

1989 births
Footballers from São Paulo
Living people
Brazilian footballers
Colo Colo de Futebol e Regatas players
Grêmio Esportivo Juventus players
Akademik Sofia players
Brazilian expatriate footballers
Expatriate footballers in Bulgaria
First Professional Football League (Bulgaria) players
Expatriate footballers in Poland
C.D. Feirense players
Liga Portugal 2 players
Expatriate footballers in Portugal
Rah Ahan players
Expatriate footballers in Iran
Expatriate footballers in the United Arab Emirates
UAE First Division League players
Khor Fakkan Sports Club players
Association football midfielders